That's the Way of the World is a 1975 film produced and directed by Sig Shore and starring Harvey Keitel. It features the music of R&B/Funk group Earth, Wind & Fire (who also appear in the picture as a fictionalized version of themselves). The film depicts the music business and the life of record executives. A soundtrack by Earth, Wind & Fire released in the same year eventually became one of the group's landmark albums.

Plot
Coleman Buckmaster (Harvey Keitel), also known as "the Golden Ear", is a producer extraordinaire for A-Chord Records.  In the midst of working slavishly to complete the debut album of "the Group" (Earth, Wind & Fire), Buckmaster is forced to put their project on the back-burner in favor of a new signing to A-Chord, "the Pages," Velour (Cynthia Bostick), Gary (Jimmy Boyd) and Franklin (Bert Parks). According to label head Carlton James (Ed Nelson), the Pages represent good, old-fashioned, wholesome family values. According to Buckmaster, they represent everything wrong with the music business: a soulless pastiche of cheese-on-white-bread, and he wants nothing to do with them. However, due to his contract, he is forced to turn the flat song of their demo, "Joy, Joy, Joy" into a workable hit. In the meantime, he ends up in a relationship with Velour, seemingly also against his will, but he is able to use the relationship to his and the Group's advantage, then to break the news of a makeshift marriage to Velour, updated her part of the music contract, the Pages. A twist where everybody wins.

Cast

John Szymanski as Russell

See also
 List of American films of 1975

External links
 

1975 films
Earth, Wind & Fire video albums
Blaxploitation films
1975 drama films
United Artists films
1970s English-language films
American exploitation films
American drama films
1970s American films